Allen Lindsey "Dusty" Cooke (June 23, 1907 – November 21, 1987), was an American professional baseball outfielder, coach, and manager, in Major League Baseball (MLB), who played for three different big league teams, between  and . He batted left-handed and threw right-handed. He was born in Swepsonville, North Carolina.

Playing career
Cooke's professional playing career lasted for 16 seasons (1927–1942). Known mainly for his defensive abilities, he was a competent fourth outfielder who was able to handle all three outfield positions. In , Cooke reached the major leagues with the New York Yankees. He spent three seasons there before moving on to the Boston Red Sox (–) and Cincinnati Reds. Cooke's most productive season came in 1933 with Boston, when he batted .293 and posted career-best numbers in games played (119), runs (86), doubles (35), triples (10), and runs batted in (RBI) (54). In , he hit a career-high .306, in 100 games, while compiling a .400 on-base percentage (tenth in the American League).

In his eight-season MLB career, Cooke was a .280 lifetime hitter (489-for-1,745), with 24 home runs and 229 RBI in 608 games played, including 324 runs, 109 doubles, 28 triples, 32 stolen bases, .384 on-base percentage, .416 slugging percentage and a solid walk-to-strikeout ratio of 1.06 (290-to-276).

Military service
Cooke enlisted in the Navy's Aviation Cadet Training Program located on the University of North Carolina at Chapel Hill campus in 1943. Cooke was stunned that one of the first recruits he met upon his arrival in the dormitory was Ted Williams, the American League batting champion. Cooke did not complete aviation training and instead spent the war as a Navy pharmacist's mate, 3rd class. During the war, Cooke participated in the Iwo Jima where his ship was attacked for more than three hours by Kamikaze, and then several months later in the Battle of Okinawa.

Athletic trainer, coach and manager
Cooke was a coach through June 30, 1952, including service on the 1950 "Whiz Kids" team, that won the National League pennant. He also was the Phillies' interim manager, from July 16–25, 1948, after the firing of Ben Chapman. Cooke posted a 6–6 record (.500), before handing over the reins to the team's permanent skipper, Eddie Sawyer.

Cooke died in Raleigh, North Carolina, November 21, 1987, at age 80.

References

External links

Dusty Cooke at SABR (Baseball BioProject)

1907 births
1987 deaths
United States Navy personnel of World War II
Asheville Tourists players
Baseball players from North Carolina
Boston Red Sox players
Cincinnati Reds players
Durham Bulls players
Jersey City Giants players
Major League Baseball outfielders
Minneapolis Millers (baseball) players
Newark Bears (IL) players
New York Yankees players
People from Swepsonville, North Carolina
Philadelphia Phillies coaches
Philadelphia Phillies managers
Rochester Red Wings players
St. Paul Saints (AA) players
United States Navy sailors